The Leeds municipal elections were held on Thursday 10 May 1951, with boundary changes prompting the whole council's re-election. With the new wards the council grew by a further two (two additional wards also represented an increase of six councillors and two aldermen), as thirteen newly created wards replaced the eleven that were abolished:

Abolished:
Armley & Wortley
Central
Cross Gates & Temple Newsam
Farnley & Wortley
Holbeck North
Holbeck South
Hunslet Carr & Middleton
Mill Hill & South
North
Upper Armley
West Hunslet

Created: 
Allerton
Armley
City
Cross Gates
Halton
Holbeck
Hunslet Carr
Meanwood
Middleton
Moortown
Stanningley
Wellington
Wortley

 

 

There was a three percent swing from Labour to the Conservatives (as compared to 1949 – swings from 1950's distorted results show much larger swings as seen below) on the night, delivering the Conservatives control of the council with a 30-seat majority. Turnout naturally rose from the previous year's scarcely contested election, to an above average figure of 45.9%.

Election result

The result had the following consequences for the total number of seats on the council after the elections:

Ward results

References

1951 English local elections
1951
1950s in Leeds